Ivory Music and Video, Inc. (formerly Ivory Records Corporation) is a record label based in the Philippines.

The label works with OPM veteran artists and bands/groups such as the Company, Side A, Wolfgang, MYMP, Roselle Nava and April Boy Regino, as well as contemporary artists like Maja Salvador and Silent Sanctuary.

Ivory Music and Video also released video karaoke VCDs versions of the label's songs in the Philippines.

History
Tony Ocampo set up Ivory Music and Video (as Ivory Records at that time) on August 11, 1983. The name came from the fact that he and his siblings were encouraged by their parents to play the piano. Ivory started operations by licensing products for Victor Musical Industries and Enigma Records. Not long after, they started to shift its focus to homegrown music by signing up Asin, Ketama, the Company and Roselle Nava, among others.

Ivory gave birth to rising acoustic group MYMP in 2003 when IFM management led by Raymund Ryan saw their gig and it caught Ivory's attention. In that same year during their 20th anniversary, they welcomed Marielle and broadcast journalist Love Anover to their roster and moved its offices from the Quad Center Building in Ortigas Avenue, San Juan to the Dona Parel Building at the Aurora Boulevard in Quezon City until sometime in early 2018. By that same period, they handled distribution for some releases of GMA Records until sometime in 2007.

The label began handling distribution for the catalog of Sony Music in the Philippines on July 1, 2011, as part of the Philippine branch's downsize in operations. Eventually, Sony Music Philippines closed its operations after a long battle with widespread piracy in February 2012. 
Years later, Ivory Music launched its digital label and talent management unit, Enterphil Entertainment.

Updates on the artists of Sony Music were phased out from their social media pages by January 2018, and it was apparent that the distribution deal with Sony Music had been expired by that time as Sony Music was preparing for the resumption of its operations in the Philippines.

The label, ahead of its 40th anniversary celebration in 2023, formally launched a new batch of artists like CJ Navato, Nonoy Pena, Karl Zarate, Meg Zurbito, Leann Ganzon, and bands like Stereotype.

Artists

Current

Enterphil Entertainment

Former artists

References

External links

Philippine independent record labels
Record labels established in 1983
Companies based in Quezon City
Philippine companies established in 1983
1983 establishments in the Philippines
Privately held companies of the Philippines